Monica Jones may refer to:
Monica Jones (activist), American transgender and sex work activist
Monica Jones, lover of Philip Larkin